Knottingley is an electoral ward of the City of Wakefield district used for elections to Wakefield Metropolitan District Council.

Overview 
The ward is one of 21 in the Wakefield district and has had the same boundaries since the 2004 Council election. As of 2015, the electorate stands at 12,495 of which 96.2% identify as "White British" and 69.4% of who identify as Christian.

Notable parts of the ward include Knottingley and Ferrybridge with notable landmarks including Ferrybridge Power Stations, Kellingley Colliery and Willow Garth Nature Reserve.

Representation 
Like all wards in the Wakefield district, Knottingley has 3 councillors, whom are elected on a 4-year-rota. This means elections for new councillors are held for three years running, with one year every four years having no elections.

The current councillors are Harry Ellis from Labour and the Liberal Democrats' Tom Gordon and Adele Hayes. Knottingley is the only ward with a Liberal Democrat councillor in Wakefield Council since 2011, winning the seat after not standing a candidate in the ward since 2003.

Councillors

Election results since 1996 

The boundaries were changed in the 2004 election resulting in all three positions becoming vacant.

See also 

 Wakefield Metropolitan District Council elections

Notes

References 

City of Wakefield
Knottingley
Wards of Wakefield